Herman Edward "Red" Smith (August 31, 1906 – May 8, 1959) was an American football, baseball, and track coach. He served as the head football coach at Hampden–Sydney College in Hampden Sydney, Virginia from 1939 to 1941 and Furman University in Greenville, South Carolina from 1948 to 1949, compiling a career college football coaching record of 15–28–1.  Smith was also the head baseball coach at The Citadel, The Military College of South Carolina in 1936.

Born in Mountville, South Carolina, Smith played football at Furman and was selected as All-Southern Intercollegiate Athletic Association (SIAA) as a tackle.  He began his coaching career at Simpsonville High School in Simpsonville, South Carolina before moving to Gaffney High School in Gaffney, South Carolina.  Smith earned a Master of Arts degree from the University of Michigan.

Head coaching record

College football

References

External links
 

1906 births
1959 deaths
American football tackles
Furman Paladins athletic directors
Furman Paladins football coaches
Furman Paladins football players
Hampden–Sydney Tigers football coaches
North Carolina Pre-Flight Cloudbusters football coaches
The Citadel Bulldogs baseball coaches
College track and field coaches in the United States
High school football coaches in South Carolina
University of Michigan alumni
People from Laurens County, South Carolina
People from Spartanburg County, South Carolina
Players of American football from South Carolina